Pierre Biémouret (11 April 1943 – 23 November 2022) was a French rugby union player who played as a flanker.

Biography
Biémouret worked as a farmer. From 1969 to 1973, he was a member of the French national team, playing his first match on 22 February 1969 against England. His last national team game came against Ireland on 14 April 1973. He played in two test matches in South Africa in 1971. He began his professional career with SU Agen in 1965, which won the French rugby union championship in 1966.

He captained a game against South Africa during a tournament in France in 1974.

After winning this title, he retired from playing rugby. In the early 1990s, he coached the Italian team Parma F.C..

Biémouret's wife, Gisèle, served as a member of the French National Assembly from 2007 to 2022.

Pierre Biémouret died in Toulouse on 23 November 2022, at the age of 79.

References

1943 births
2022 deaths
French rugby union players
France international rugby union players
SU Agen Lot-et-Garonne players
Rugby union flankers
Sportspeople from Gers